Jonathan Scoville (July 14, 1830 – March 4, 1891) was an American businessman who served two terms as a U.S. Representative from New York from 1880 to 1883, and as mayor of Buffalo from 1884 to 1885.

Biography 
Born in Salisbury, Connecticut, Scoville attended various educational institutions in Massachusetts, including the scientific department of Harvard University.

He engaged in business in Canaan, Connecticut, in 1854 as an iron manufacturer and mine owner.
He moved to Buffalo, New York, in 1860 and established a car-wheel foundry, and the next year established another in Toronto, Ontario, Canada.

Political career

Congress 
Scoville was elected as a Democrat to the Forty-sixth Congress to fill the vacancy caused by the resignation of Ray V. Pierce.
He was reelected to the Forty-seventh Congress and served from November 12, 1880, to March 3, 1883.
He was not a candidate for renomination in 1882.

Mayor of Buffalo 
He served as mayor of Buffalo in 1884 and 1885.

Death 
He died in New York City, March 4, 1891.
He was interred in Salisbury Cemetery, Salisbury, Connecticut.

References

Sources

 

1830 births
1891 deaths
Harvard University alumni
Mayors of Buffalo, New York
Democratic Party members of the United States House of Representatives from New York (state)
19th-century American politicians